"Shoes" is a song by Canadian country pop singer Shania Twain. It was the first single released from the Desperate Housewives soundtrack in 2005. The song was co-written by Twain and her then-husband, Robert John "Mutt" Lange, along with Tammy Hyler, Joie Scott, and Kim Tribble. It is the last studio recording issued by Twain prior to the dissolution of her marriage to Lange, and the last Twain recording to feature any involvement from Lange. The song was originally written and recorded for use on the ABC television program Desperate Housewives.

Song information
The music video for "Shoes" was to feature the four main actresses of Desperate Housewives alongside Twain, and debut before the second season premiere, however the video was canceled. The song did fairly well on the charts considering there was no promotion by the label or Twain, it reached number 29 at country radio. The single was later released for airplay in Australia and Europe, with a new pop mix. A few adult contemporary stations in Canada played the remix of "Shoes" produced by Joe Bermudez. According to his website, the producers of the show wanted something more "hip" to play for the show, and that's why a third version of the song was made. In 2006 it was announced "Shoes" would be released commercially in the UK, but the release was never shipped from EMI to retailers, and was finally canceled. This is the second time a single release was canceled in the UK, the last time was in 2004, when "She's Not Just a Pretty Face" was canceled.

Critical reception
Billboard magazine's Chuck Taylor gave a fairly unfavorable review for "Shoes" saying "Twain certainly remains a major talent with plenty left to say, but these "Shoes" have no soul." AllMusic called the song "sublimely silly" and chose it as an AMG Track Pick.

Chart performance 
"Shoes" debuted on the Billboard Hot Country Songs chart the week of September 10, 2005 at  number 57. The single spent 13 weeks on the chart and climbed to a peak position of number 29 on November 5, 2005, where it remained for one week. "Shoes" became Twain's third consecutive single to miss the top 20.

Official versions
Album Version (3:53)
Pop Mix  (3:55) 
Bermudez & Harris 6" Stiletto Mix  (3:12)

Charts

Release history

References

2005 singles
2005 songs
Shania Twain songs
Songs written by Robert John "Mutt" Lange
Song recordings produced by Robert John "Mutt" Lange
Songs written by Shania Twain
Lyric Street Records singles
Songs written by Tammy Hyler
Songs written by Kim Tribble